was a Japanese seismologist. As a University of Tokyo seismologist he represented a new generation of scientists, trained by Western experts. He who predicted the timing and magnitude of the 1923 Great Kantō earthquake 16 years in advance.

Born in a poor family, he nonetheless managed to study at the Imperial University of Tokyo. In 1899, in anticipation of the later theory of plate tectonics, he argued that the tsunami that struck the Sanriku coast of Honshū island in 1896 (known as the Meiji Sanriku tsunami) had been triggered by movements of the earth's crust under the sea. In a paper written in 1905, he predicted that a major earthquake would hit the Kantō region around Tokyo within 50 years and kill over 100,000 people, and advocated that measures be taken. His worries materialized when the Great Kantō earthquake devastated Tokyo in 1923, claiming more than 100,000 victims. 

In 1939, while working for the Seismological Observatory of Tokyo University, Imamura made a reconstruction of Zhang Heng's seismoscope (132 CE), considered to have been the first such device ever made.

External links
 
 今村明恒 ["Imamura Akitsune"] (in Japanese)

Further reading

1870 births
1948 deaths
People from Kagoshima
Japanese seismologists